Geoffrey Charles Ryman (born 1951) is a Canadian writer of science fiction, fantasy, slipstream and historical fiction.

Biography
Ryman was born in Canada and moved to the United States at age 11. He earned degrees in History and English at UCLA, then moved to England in 1973, where he has lived most of his life. He is gay.

In addition to being an author, Ryman started a web design team for the UK government at the Central Office of Information in 1994. He also led the teams that designed the first official British Monarchy and 10 Downing Street websites, and worked on the UK government's flagship website www.direct.gov.uk.

Works 
Ryman says he knew he was a writer "before [he] could talk", with his first work published in his mother's newspaper column at six years of age.
He is best known for his science fiction; however, his first novel was the fantasy The Warrior Who Carried Life, and his revisionist fantasy of The Wizard of Oz, Was..., has been called "his most accomplished work".

Much of Ryman's work is based on travels to Cambodia. The first of these, The Unconquered Country (1986) was winner of the World Fantasy Award and British Science Fiction Association Award. His novel The King's Last Song (2006) was set both in the Angkor Wat era and the time after Pol Pot and the Khmer Rouge.

Ryman has written, directed and performed in several plays based on works by other writers.

He was guest of honour at Novacon in 1989 and has twice been a guest speaker at Microcon, in 1994 and in 2004. He was also the guest of honour at the national Swedish science fiction convention Swecon in 2006, at Gaylaxicon 2008, at Wiscon 2009, and at Åcon 2010. An article by Wendy Gay Pearson on Ryman's novel The Child Garden won the British Science Fiction Foundation's graduate essay award and was published in a special issue of Foundation on LGBT science fiction edited by Andrew M. Butler in 2002. Ryman's works were also the subject of a special issue of Extrapolation in 2008, with articles dealing with Air, The Child Garden, Lust, and Was, in particular. Neil Easterbrook's article in this special issue, "'Giving An Account of Oneself': Ethics, Alterity, Air" won the Science Fiction Research Association's 2009 Pioneer Award for best published article on science fiction (this award has since been renamed the SFRA Innovative Research Award). The issue includes an interview with Geoff Ryman by Canadian speculative fiction writer Hiromi Goto. The introduction to the special issue, by Susan Knabe and Wendy Gay Pearson, also responds to Ryman's call for Mundane science fiction.

Mundane science fiction is a subgenre of science fiction focusing on stories set on or near the Earth, with a believable use of technology and science as it exists at the time the story is written. The Mundane SF movement was founded in 2002 during the Clarion workshop by Ryman and others. In 2008 a Mundane SF issue of Interzone magazine was published, guest-edited by Ryman, Julian Todd and Trent Walters.

Ryman has lectured at the University of Manchester since at least 2007; as of 2022 he is an Honorary Senior Lecturer in Creative Writing for University of Manchester's English Department, where in 2011 he won the Faculty Students' Teaching Award for the School of Arts, History and Culture.

As of 2008 he was at work on a new historical novel set in the United States before their Civil War.

Bibliography

Novels
 The Unconquered Country (1984)
 The Warrior Who Carried Life (1985)
 The Child Garden (1989)
 Was... (1992)
 253, or Tube Theatre (1996 online, 1998 print)
 Lust (2001)
 Air: Or, Have not Have (2005)
 The King's Last Song (2006 UK, 2008 US)

Collections
 Unconquered countries: Four novellas (1994)
 Paradise Tales (July 2011, Small Beer Press)

Awards 

|-
| valign=top |
British Science Fiction Award
 The Unconquered Country for Best Short (1984)
 Air for Best Novel (2005)

World Fantasy Award
 The Unconquered Country Best Novella (1985)

Arthur C. Clarke Award
 The Child Garden for Best Novel (1990)
 Air (2005)
| valign=top |
Campbell Award
 The Child Garden for Best Novel (1990)

 Philip K. Dick Award
 253: The Print Remix, 1998

 James Tiptree, Jr. Award
 Air (2005)

 Nebula Award for Best Novelette
 What We Found (2012)

References

External links
 
 Author page at Small Beer Press
 Comment on the victims of the 7 July 2005 London bombings
 Interview with Geoff Ryman conducted by Kit Reed at Infinity Plus, discussing his novel Air and the Mundane SF movement.
 Compilation of reviews of Ryman's book The King's Last Song
 Biog page at the University of Manchester
Ryman special issue of Extrapolation at Liverpool University Press

1951 births
Living people
British science fiction writers
Canadian science fiction writers
Canadian gay writers
English LGBT writers
The Magazine of Fantasy & Science Fiction people
University of California, Los Angeles alumni
World Fantasy Award-winning writers
Nebula Award winners
British male novelists